Sergiu Mocanu (born 6 June 1961)  is a Moldovan politician who served as member of Parliament of Moldova for two terms (1994-1997; 1998-2001) and held the position of Presidential Advisor with special missions for President Vladimir Voronin from 2004 to 2007. He has been leader of Popular Movement Anti-Mafia Party of Moldova since 2011.

Biography 

Sergiu Mocanu held the position of member of the Parliament of the Republic of Moldova from 1994 to 2001, member of the Christian Democratic Popular Front and editor of the newspaper "Ţara" from 1994 to 1998. He was also member of the Party of Rebirth and Reconciliation of Moldova from 1998 to 2003 and of the Liberal Party (Moldova).

He was a special guest (15 May 1994 – 25 September 1995) and representative (25 September 1995 – 23 June 1997) at the Parliamentary Assembly of the Council of Europe.

Sergiu Mocanu served as adviser of the president of Moldova Vladimir Voronin from February 2, 2004 to June 26, 2007. Since 2011, he holds the position of president of the Popular Movement Anti-Mafia Party of Republic of Moldova.

Awards 
 Order „Ştefan cel Mare”, 1992 (highest military distinction in Moldova)

References

External links 
 SERGIU MOCANU. Mereu gata de luptă
 Vladimir Voronin l-a demis pe consilierul său cu misiuni speciale Sergiu Mocanu
 SERGIU MOCANU. Sfidând înălţimile
 Sergiu Mocanu

1961 births
Romanian people of Moldovan descent
Living people
People from Cantemir District
Moldovan journalists
Male journalists
Moldovan MPs 1994–1998
Moldovan MPs 1998–2001